Everybody Loves Sausages is an album of cover songs by the Melvins, released on April 30, 2013. In similar fashion to The Crybaby it features guests on most of the tracks and even features the Melvins Lite on three tracks.

Three of the tracks had been previously released in splits. Black Betty previously appeared on a split 7-inch with the Jon Spencer Blues Explosion covering the same track. Female Trouble and Carpe Diem are featured on a split 12-inch with Redd Kross. A nine-part 7-inch Tribute series was released through Amphetamine Reptile Records between 2013 and 2015. Featuring ten songs from the album, seven of them featured bonus cover songs of each respective band.

Track listing

"Heathen Earth" is not actually a cover but an interpretation in the vein of Throbbing Gristle as there's no actual song by the band with that song title, just one of their albums. Osborne stated in an interview with Spin Magazine "This is Throbbing Gristle's Heathen Earth in the style of what Throbbing Gristle would do.".

Tribute Series

Vol. 1: A Tribute to the Scientists

Vol. 2: A Tribute to Venom

Vol. 3: A Tribute to the Kinks

Vol. 4: A Tribute to Pop-O-Pies and Tales of Terror

Vol. 5: A Tribute to Roxy Music

Vol. 6: A Tribute to David Bowie

Vol. 7: A Tribute to Queen

Vol. 8: A Tribute to The Jam

Vol. 9: A Tribute to Throbbing Gristle

Personnel
Buzz Osborne – guitar (1-6 & 8-12), bass (1, 4 & 5), vocals (3, 6-8 & 11), backing vocals (1, 2, 10 & 12), stylophone (5 & 10), all instruments (13)
Dale Crover – drums (1-12), backing vocals (1-3, 6, 8 & 9)
with
Jared Warren – bass (2, 3, 6 & 8), backing vocals (2, 3 & 8)
Coady Willis – drums (2, 3, 6 & 8), backing vocals (3 & 8)

Special Guest Stars
Scott Kelly – guitar & vocals (1)
Caleb Benjamin – vocals (2)
Mark Arm – vocals (4)
J.G. Thirlwell – vocals & vocal engineer (5)
Clem Burke – drums (6)
Trevor Dunn – double bass (7, 9 & 11), vocals (9)
Jello Biafra – vocals (10)
Kevin Rutmanis – bass (10)
Tom Hazelmyer – guitar & vocals (12)

Additional personnel
Toshi Kasai – engineer, keyboards (2 & 5)
John Golden – mastering
Mackie Osborne – artwork

References

Melvins albums
2013 albums
Covers albums
Ipecac Recordings albums
Experimental rock albums by American artists